Matthew DeVries (born January 28, 1977) is the former rhythm guitarist in the heavy metal band Chimaira and the former bassist in the metal band Fear Factory. During his time with Chimaira, he, along with Rob Arnold (the lead guitarist) and Mark Hunter (the lead singer), wrote many of the band's songs. In 2005, DeVries appeared on the Roadrunner United: The All Star Sessions album, playing on two of the tracks written by Joey Jordison of Slipknot, "Annihilation by the Hands of God," and "Constitution Down".

In 2003, DeVries was beaten badly in Liverpool while on tour with Chimaira. The attack was unprovoked and had nothing to do with DeVries' membership of Chimaira or Chimaira's genre of music in general. The band's next two performances, in Dublin, Ireland and Belfast, Northern Ireland were scheduled as normal and the band performed both concerts as a five-piece, while DeVries recovered in hospital. He was then able to join them after that for the rest of the UK/European Tour.

It was announced in March 2011 that DeVries would be the touring bassist for Six Feet Under along with fellow Chimaira guitarist Rob Arnold and former Chimaira drummer Kevin Talley.

Matt DeVries left Chimaira after Chimaira Christmas '11 for 'personal reasons'.

In February 2012, he joined industrial metal band, Fear Factory, replacing Byron Stroud as bassist. He left the band in May 2015, being replaced by former Static-X and current Ministry bassist Tony Campos.

In February 2014, he began touring as the bassist for Unearth.

He filled in for John Campbell from Lamb of God on the last 2013 leg of their Resolution Tour, who had to pull out due to a family emergency.

On June 21, 2017, Chimaira announced a one-off reunion show would take place on December 30, 2017. Matt later confirmed this on his social media accounts.

DeVries endorses ESP Guitars, and he plays his LTD MFA-600 signature model. It features an alder Viper body, a maple neck through the body with an ebony fingerboard, a TonePros Tune-O-Matic bridge, locking tuners and one EMG 81 pickup. While playing bass in Unearth and Fear Factory, he would use LTD B-series 5-string bass guitars, but eventually switched to using Ibanez Soundgear 5-string bass guitars in 2013.

Discography 

The Impossibility of Reason (2003), Roadrunner
The Dehumanizing Process (2004), Roadrunner – DVD
Chimaira (2005), Roadrunner
Resurrection (2007), Ferret (U.S.) & Nuclear Blast
The Infection (2009), Ferret (U.S.) & Nuclear Blast

References 

1977 births
Living people
American heavy metal guitarists
American industrial musicians
Musicians from Cleveland
Rhythm guitarists
American people of Dutch descent
Guitarists from Ohio
Fear Factory members
Chimaira members
Six Feet Under (band) members
21st-century American guitarists
Industrial metal musicians